Arvo Mikael Ketonen (19 November 1888, Uusikaupunki – 27 May 1948) was a Finnish journalist, media executive and politician. He was a Member of the Parliament of Finland from 1939 to 1945, representing the National Progressive Party. His second wife, who followed him in running Turun Sanomat, was Irja Ketonen.

References

1888 births
1948 deaths
People from Uusikaupunki
People from Turku and Pori Province (Grand Duchy of Finland)
National Progressive Party (Finland) politicians
Members of the Parliament of Finland (1939–45)
Finnish people of World War II